This is a list of wineries in Western Australia, arranged in alphabetical order by name of winery.

See also

 Australian wine
 List of breweries in Australia
 List of vineyards and wineries
 Western Australian wine

References

External links

Blackwood Valley Wine Industry Association – official site
Geographe Wine – regional association official site
Great Southern Wine Producers Association  – official site
Manjimup Wine – regional association official site
Margaret River Wine Industry Association  – official site
Peel Wine Association – official site
Pemberton Wine Region – regional association official site
Perth Hills Wine – regional association official site
Swan Valley & Regional Winemakers Association – official site
Wines of Western Australia – WA peak industry body official site

Wineries in Western Australia
Wineries
Western Australia

Wineries